Cabo Verde Express is a Cape Verdean regional airline headquartered in Espargos and based at Amílcar Cabral International Airport operating domestic scheduled and charter services.

History
It was established in 1998 by Jean-Christophe Bartz, airline transport pilot and business man with many interests within the airline industry in West Africa. Operations started with a single Cessna Caravan (D4-CBJ). A few months later the Czech-made Let L-410 Turbolet were introduced. The airline employed 14 pilots including 2 freelancers.

The little airline grew fast under the command of Captain JC Bartz and actively contributed to the tourism development on the island of Boa Vista. Captain JC Bartz sold the airline back in 2007 to the Portuguese group Omni Aviacao, the owner of White Airways. Its head office is at the Amílcar Cabral International Airport in Espargos, Sal.

Destinations

Cape Verde
Boa Vista - Rabil Airport
Fogo - São Filipe Airport
Maio - Maio Airport
Santiago - Praia International Airport
Sal - Amílcar Cabral International Airport Hub
Sao Nicolau - Preguiça Airport
Sao Vicente - São Pedro Airport

Fleet
 Cabo Verde Express has three aircraft:

References

External links

Official website

Airlines of Cape Verde
Airlines established in 1998
Espargos